A boo hag is a mythical creature in the folklore of the Gullah culture.  It is a locally created unique contribution to the worldwide hag folklore based on the syncretic belief system of Gullah culture.

The legend
According to the legend, boo hags are similar to vampires. Unlike vampires, they gain sustenance from a person's breath, as opposed to their blood, by riding their victims.

They have no skin and are  red. In order to be less conspicuous, they steal a victim's skin and use it for as long as it holds out, wearing it as one might wear clothing. They remove and hide this skin before going riding.

When a hag determines a victim is suitable for riding, the hag generally gains access to the home through a small crack, crevices, or hole. Then hags itself over the sleeping/dazing victim, sucking in their breath. This act renders the victim helpless and induces a deep dream-filled sleep. The hag tends to leave the victim alive, so as to use them again for their energy. However, if the victim struggles, the hag may take their skin, leaving the victim to suffer. After taking the victim's energy, the hag flies off, as they must be in their skin by dawn or be forever trapped without skin. When the victim awakes, they may feel short of breath, sick and very dizzy but generally the victim only feels tired.

An expression sometimes used in South Carolina is "don't let the hag ride ya." This expression may come from the boo hag legend.

Boo hags outside of Gullah culture
While boo hags are a product of Gullah culture, the legend has become known on a wider scale. The legend has been used as an object lesson in stranger danger. The legend has also been the subject of song, and poetry.

In 2005, a boo hag became a character in a children's book called Precious and the Boo Hag by Patricia C. McKissack and Onawumi Jean Moss. In the story, the boo hag is said to be strange and tricky, and it does anything to get into the house. Precious, the main character, is told by her brother that the boo hag also "...tries to make you disobey yo' mama!"

In Black Wings, Grey Skies by Hailey Edwards, a boo hag has gone rogue and starts killing children and the occasional adult. A group of boo hags decides to help the main character bring the villain down.

Lady Night, a kind boo hag, appears as a character in Tristan Strong Destroys the World, the second book in the Tristan Strong series.

See also
Mare (folklore)
Hoodoo (folk magic)
Baba Yaga
Black Annis
Crone
Hag
Muma Pădurii
Onibaba (folklore)
The Witch (fairy tale)

References

External links
 Ghosts & Legends Tour of Charleston
 Spooky Streets Contains a note regarding a link between racial inequality and boo hags.
 Forum thread with a slightly different account of the legend
 Boo Hag Story

 

South Carolina culture
American folklore
South Carolina folklore
American legendary creatures
Shapeshifting
Gullah culture
Hags